Pudur (S) is a panchayat town in Tenkasi district in the Indian state of Tamil Nadu.

Demographics
 India census, Pudur (S) had a population of 11,095. Males constitute 49% of the population and females 51%. Pudur (S) has an average literacy rate of 63%, higher than the national average of 59.5%: male literacy is 74%, and female literacy is 52%. In Pudur (S), 12% of the population is under 6 years of age.

References

Cities and towns in Tenkasi district